was a town located in Katsuta District, Okayama Prefecture, Japan.

As of 2003, the town had an estimated population of 3,660 and a density of 41.93 persons per km². The total area was 87.29 km².

On March 31, 2005, Katsuta, along with the towns of Mimasaka (former), Aida, Ōhara and Sakutō, and the village of Higashiawakura (all from Aida District), was merged to create the city of Mimasaka.

Geography

Adjoining municipalities
Okayama Prefecture
Mimasaka (town)
Sakutō
Ōhara
Nishiawakura
Shōō
Nagi
Tottori Prefecture
Wakasa

Education
Katsuta Elementary School
Katsuta-Higashi Elementary School
Kajinami Elementary School
Katsuta Junior High School

Transportation

Road
National highways:
Route 429
Prefectural roads:
Okayama Prefectural Route 7 (Chizu-Katsuta)
Okayama Prefectural Route 51 (Mimasaka-Nagi)
Okayama Prefectural Route 356 (Gyōhō-Katsuta)
Okayama Prefectural Route 357 (Kajinami-Tateishi)
Okayama Prefectural Route 388 (Magata-Mimasaka)
Okayama Prefectural Route 479 (Seto-Munakake)

External links
Official website of Mimasaka in Japanese

Dissolved municipalities of Okayama Prefecture
Mimasaka, Okayama